The 2008 Eastern Creek round of the V8 Supercar Championship was the second round of the Australian 2008 V8 Supercar season. It was held on the weekend of 7 to 9 March at Eastern Creek Raceway, in the outer suburbs of Sydney, the capital of New South Wales.

Qualifying
Qualifying was held on Saturday 8 March. The Holden Racing Team secured the front row, Garth Tander taking the pole from Mark Skaife. It was Tander first pole position for his new team. Rick Kelly made a 1-2-3 for the extended Walkinshaw Performance operation with series leader Jamie Whincup the leading Ford in fourth place.

Race 1
Race 1 was held on Saturday 8 March. After the race both Paul Dumbrell and Paul Morris were both relegated five finishing positions for driving infringements.

Race 2
Race 2 was held on Sunday 9 March. Will Davison scores his debut V8 Supercar race win, his first win since the British Formula 3 Championship.

Race 3
Race 3 was held on Sunday 9 March. With a sixth-place finish in the third race to back up the second and first from the first two race Will Davison scored his debut round victory, the first for the Jim Beam Racing team since the 2001 Queensland 500. The field was bunched together at the finish after a late race safety car period after a tyre failure caused Steven Richards to crash his Falcon into the barriers at 150 km/h. The car was destroyed and the team had to revert to a spare for the next race, the Grand Prix support event at Albert Park.

Results
Results as follows:

Qualifying

Race 1 results

Race 2 results

Race 3 results

Standings
After round 2 of 14

References

External links
Official timing and results

Eastern Creek
Motorsport at Eastern Creek Raceway